Mathews Thimothios is the Metropolitan of the Chengannur Orthodox Diocese of the Malankara Orthodox Syrian Church.

Childhood and education
Mathews Thimothios was born on 3 May 1963 as the eldest son of P.J. Baby and his wife Thankamma Baby of Painuvilla Puthenveettil. He is a member of St. Mary's Cathedral Puthiakavu, Mavelikkara. He took his degree as a student of Bishop Moore College Mavelikkara, G. S. T. from Orthodox Theological Seminary and B. D and M.Th. from Serampore University. He also attained the Licentiate in sacred scripture from the Pontifical Institute in Rome and Diploma in Biblical Archeology from the Pontifical Bible Institute in Jerusalem. He was awarded a doctoral degree from the Pontifical University of Saint Thomas Aquinas, Rome. He speaks Italian, French, German, Aramaic, Hebrew, English, and Malayalam.

Priestly life

Mathews has served in many key positions including the Joint Secretary of St. Thomas Orthodox Vaidika Sanghum, Publisher of the Purohithan quarterly, Secretary of the Vattasseril Mar Dionysius Charitable Fund, Dean of Post Graduate Studies-FFRRC, Member of the Board of Studies for Old Testament, Serampore University, Member of the Bible Translation Committee-Bible Society, Kerala, Registrar of Orthodox Theological Seminary, Kottayam.

His priestly ministry is spread over 18 years and has served as Assistance. Vicar and Vicar in 8 parishes under the jurisdiction of three dioceses, namely Kollam, Kottayam and Mavelikara. He has published several books including OVBS text books, Teacher’s Guide etc. and an exegetical study of Psalm 24 which was published in Rome.

Metropolitan of UK, Europe and Africa Diocese
The Malankara Syrian Christian Association met on 11 September 2008 at Pampakuda elected him as the bishop along with six others. On 4 December 2008 Baselios Mar Thoma Didymos I received his profession as Ramban. On 19 February 2009 he was ordained to the episcopate by Baselios Mar Thoma Didymos I at St. George Orthodox Church, Puthuppally.

References
Official website of Malankara Orthodox Church
Official website of UK, Europe and Africa Diocese

Malankara Orthodox Syrian Church bishops
Oriental Orthodoxy in the United Kingdom
Oriental Orthodoxy in Africa
1964 births
Living people
21st-century Oriental Orthodox archbishops